Mama is a 1990 Chinese film directed by Zhang Yuan. Zhang Yuan's directorial debut, Mama is now considered a seminal film in the history of Chinese independent cinema, and by extension, as a pioneering film of the Sixth Generation of which Zhang is a member. Shot on a very low budget within Zhang Yuan's apartment, Mama follows the story of a mother and her mentally challenged adult son.

Plot 
The film focuses on a librarian struggling to raise her mentally handicapped son in modern-day Beijing while at the same time dealing with an absent and unresponsive husband. The story garnered much criticism from state-censors, who found the film too dark.

While the film was originally written to end on the dour note of the mother euthanizing her son, director Zhang Yuan eventually opted for a more open-ended and ambiguous conclusion.

Production history 
The film that was to become Mama began as a screenplay in the Children's Film Studio for a film entitled The Sun Tree as based on a story by writer Dai Qing. Zhang Yuan at the time was still a student in the Beijing Film Academy's cinematography department and was slated to serve as the film's director of photography, with Fifth Generation graduate Sun Chen slated to direct. For three months, Zhang worked with screenwriter (and planned lead actor) Qin Yan and Sun storyboarding The Sun Tree. The studio, however, ultimately decided that the film was not profitable and canceled production.

The project was then picked up by the August First Film Studio, now with Gong Yiqun set as the director. During this second production period, Zhang Yuan again was set to serve as cinematographer and conducted several location scouting trips to Dunhuang. However, August First canceled the production shortly after the 1989 Tiananmen Square protests and massacre, in part because Dai Qing had supported the demonstrations and was now a problematic figure politically.

With the project seemingly dead, Zhang Yuan and Qin Yan decided to produce the film independently, asking friends and family for funds. Zhang, Qin, and Zhang's wife, screenwriter Ning Dai also went back to rework the film's original story. The result was a film, in Zhang's words, that "was completely different" and "something much closer to the everyday reality of average Chinese people."

While Zhang Yuan's friend, director Wang Xiaoshuai, was originally set to direct, Zhang himself eventually took over directing duties.

The film was ultimately shot in 1989 in Zhang's apartment on a budget of only ¥100,000, shortly after Zhang had graduated from the BFA.

Style 
Filmed mostly in black and white, the film's small budget often shows in its minimalist style. Mama'''s small cast of characters and minimal plot would become trademarks to Zhang's films. The film is also notable as an example of Zhang's documentary leanings, as Mama also intercuts actual interviews with parents of autistic children throughout the narrative.

 Reception Mama was registered with the state-run Xi'an Film Studio, but was given only a minimal distribution in its native China. Instead the film received numerous accolades abroad, screening at several international film festivals and winning the Special Jury Prize at the Nantes Three Continents Film Festival in 1991.

Today the film is considered a pioneering work and the "first independent Chinese film since 1949." It was selected to screen in the 2005 62nd Venice International Film Festival, as part of that festival's retrospective on Chinese cinema.

 Notes 

 References 
 Berry, Michael (2005). "Working up a Sweat in a Celluloid Sauna" in Speaking in Images: Interviews with Contemporary Chinese Filmmakers. Columbia University Press. . Google Book Search. Retrieved 2008-08-25.
 Tasker, Yvonne (2002). "Zhang Yuan" in Fifty Contemporary Filmmakers. Routledge Publishing. . Google Book Search. Retrieved 2008-08-24.
 Zhang, Zhen (2007), The Urban Generation: Chinese Cinema and Society at the Turn of the Twenty-first Century''. Duke University Press. . Google Book Search. Retrieved 2008-08-25.

External links 

Mama at the Chinese Movie Database

1990 films
Chinese black-and-white films
1990 drama films
1990s Mandarin-language films
Chinese independent films
Films directed by Zhang Yuan
1990 directorial debut films
Chinese drama films
1990 independent films